Parachute Records may refer to:

 Parachute Records, Christian record label subsidiary of Parachute Music
 Parachute Records, subsidiary of Casablanca Records (1976-1979)
 Parachute Records (Eugene Chadbourne), label founded by Eugene Chadbourne in 1975